CKPA-FM is a Canadian radio station that broadcasts a country format at 89.7 FM in Ponoka, Alberta. The station is branded as 89.7 The One and is owned by Blackgold Broadcasting Ltd.

History
Blackgold received approval from the CRTC to operate a new English-language commercial FM radio station in Ponoka on September 2, 2016.

References

External links
89.7 The One 
 

Kpa
Kpa
Radio stations established in 2016
2016 establishments in Alberta